Pogonomelomys is a genus of rodent in the family Muridae endemic to New Guinea and nearby islands.
It contains the following species:

 Grey pogonomelomys (Pogonomelomys brassi)
 Lowland brush mouse (Pogonomelomys bruijni)
 Shaw Mayer's brush mouse (Pogonomelomys mayeri)

References

 
Rodent genera
Taxonomy articles created by Polbot